Tiko and the Shark is a 1962 film directed by Folco Quilici and based on a novel Ti-Coyo and His Shark by Clement Richer. An international co-production of France and Italy, the film's plot follows the friendship between a fisherman and a shark that begins in their youth. Filming took place on location in French Polynesia.

Cast
 Al Kauwe as Ti-Koyo
 Dennis Pouira as Ti-Koyo as a child
 Marlene Among as Diana
 Diane Samsoi as Diana as a child

Reception
Leo Pestelli, writing for La Stampa, criticized the film for its perceived focus on the relationship between Ti-Koyo and his human love interest as opposed to his relationship with the shark.

References

External links
 

1962 films
Italian drama films
Films about sharks
Films based on novels
Films shot in French Polynesia
1960s Italian films